Coq d'Or may refer to:

Le Coq d'Or, opera by Rimsky-Korsakov
Le Coq d'Or, a mime ballet based on extracts from the opera by Diaghilev 
Le Coq d'Or in Paris where Heath Lamberts learnt his craft

Restaurants
Coq d'Or, Mayfair London, now Langan's Brasserie
Coq d'Or (Rotterdam restaurant), defunct Michelin starred restaurant, 
le Coq D'Or Restaurant, Sydney, location of Elaine Haxton mural  1944 Sir John Sulman Prize

Other
Coq d'Or (prize), songwriting prize won by André Pascal and others
Coq d'Or (horse), beat Gay Crusader in 1917